Jovančević or Jovancevic is a common  Croatian and a Serbian surname. The last name can be translated as Johnny's son leading to the English equivalent last name of Johnnyson

Geographical distribution
As of 2016, the frequency of the surname Jovančević was highest in Croatia (1: 2,733), followed by Serbia (1: 4,862).

People
Notable people with the surname include:

 Aleksandar Jovančević

References

Croatian surnames
Serbian surnames